Frank Fowler may refer to:
 Francis George Fowler (1871–1918), sometimes Frank Fowler, English writer on English language, grammar and usage
 Frank Fowler (artist) (1852–1910), American painter
 Frank Fowler (writer) (1833–1863), English writer
 Frank Oliver Fowler (1861–1945), Manitoba, Canada, politician
 Franklin Fowler (1842–1902), American Boston maritime pilot

See also
Francis Fowler (disambiguation)